Reza Naji is an Iranian actor and an iconic figure of Iranian cinema.

Naji started his career in theater when he was a teenager. While serving in the Iranian army, he continued to perform in different roles. His first role in a film goes back to 1997 in Children of Heaven, which proved to be a breakthrough. For playing the role of Ali's father, director Majid Majidi was seeking an actor with an Azeri accent, and Naji was carefully selected from a group of 2,500 actors tested for the role. Since then, he has played several roles in Iranian films. Among his most notable performances is his appearance in The Song of Sparrows, directed by renowned film director Majid Majidi, for which Naji won the Silver Bear at the Berlin Film Festival, and Best Performance by an Actor at the 2008 Asia Pacific Screen Awards.

Filmography

Awards
 2008: Berlin International Film Festival: Silver Bear for Best Actor: The Song of Sparrows  
 2008: Best Performance by an Actor at the Asia Pacific Screen Awards.

References

External links
 

Iranian male film actors
People from Tabriz
Living people
1942 births
Silver Bear for Best Actor winners
20th-century Iranian male actors
21st-century Iranian male actors
Iranian male stage actors
Asia Pacific Screen Award winners